Head First is the tenth and final studio album to be released by British rock band Badfinger, released on 14 November 2000, but recorded 26 years earlier in December 1974–January 1975, at the Beatles' Apple Studios in London, although it was not released at the time. Originally intended to be Badfinger's eighth album (and third album under its six-album contract with Warner Bros. Records) (WB), the recordings were shelved when legal difficulties erupted between the band and WB that year, and the version that was finally released (as Badfinger's tenth studio album) was a rough mix of the album made in 1975 by Phil McDonald, one of the recording engineers at Apple Studios.

History

After the recording of Badfinger's previous album, Wish You Were Here, founding member Pete Ham decided to quit Badfinger. To replace him, the band added keyboardist/guitarist Bob Jackson and undertook a last tour with Ham still in the band. During the tour, Badfinger was told by its management to go back in the studio to record another new album. As a result, long-time member Joey Molland quit the group before the tour ended, and Ham then decided to stay. Because Badfinger's producer Chris Thomas opposed the decision to record a new album so soon after the last one, feeling that the band had had too little time to recover, Badfinger's management replaced him as producer with Kenny Kerner and Richie Wise, who had just become successful by producing KISS.

The remaining members of Badfinger recorded Head First in just two weeks. The difficult circumstances that surrounded Badfinger at this time contribute to the album's tone and provide the theme for two of its songs. In particular, an investigation by WB's publishing division discovered that approximately $100,000 was missing from a Badfinger escrow account. Inquiries made by WB as to the whereabouts of the money were reportedly met with silence by Badfinger's manager, American Stan Polley. Suspicions were aroused, and, fed up with what it claimed was a lack of cooperation, WB launched a "breach of contract" suit against Polley and Badfinger virtually simultaneously with the Head First recording sessions, which also sought to attach the royalties due from Wish You Were Here. Consequently, WB suspended sales of Wish You Were Here.

Although the master tapes of Head First were delivered to and accepted by WB's recording division in Los Angeles, WB's publishing arm there refused to accept them because of the lawsuit. With a lack of publishing protection, the record division shelved the tapes and the album was not released.

Unaware of the lawsuit at the time, the group had nevertheless argued amongst themselves regarding Polley's honesty and his handling of their money, factors which had contributed to Molland's departure. These sentiments came to the surface in the lyrics for two Head First tracks, "Rock & Roll Contract" and "Hey, Mr. Manager", which are indictments by bassist Tom Evans of Polley.

Badfinger became aware of the lawsuit in early 1975, simultaneous to a discontinuation of the group's salary checks from Polley. As financial turmoil mounted for the band members and its future became more uncertain, group leader Pete Ham committed suicide only four months after the album was completed.  Because of continuing financial difficulties related to Polley, which led Apple Records to also suspend the group's royalty payments and pull the group's albums from distribution, Evans then took his own life in 1983.

It appeared for many years that Head First would never be released, as the litigation between WB and Stan Polley remained unresolved, the master tapes had been misplaced, and the audio quality of known copies was so poor as to be unusable. However, four remixed and remastered songs from the master tapes for Head First — "Lay Me Down", "Passed Fast", "Keep Believing", and "Moonshine" — turned up on the original Rhino Records CD Best of Badfinger Vol. 2 (featuring Badfinger songs recorded for WB and Elektra after the band's departure from Apple Records), which was released in 1990. These songs were eventually removed from the CD after the unresolved litigation was brought to Rhino's attention. The current status of the original master tapes is unclear.

Head First was finally released on CD in 2000 on Snapper Records, using the rough mix of the recordings that was prepared by Phil McDonald at the end of the recording sessions in 1975, which was rediscovered in the late 1990s. This was the last Badfinger studio album to include Pete Ham and Mike Gibbins, and the only one to feature Bob Jackson.

Track listing
Head First's original tracking order, compiled by Kerner and Wise, was not used on the Snapper release. The following is the Snapper CD order. The songs on the second CD are demo bonus tracks.

CD 1
"Lay Me Down" (Ham)  – 3:35
"Hey, Mr. Manager" (Evans)  – 3:34
"Keep Believing" (Ham)  – 4:09
"Passed Fast" (Evans, Jackson)  – 4:19
"Rock 'N' Roll Contract" (Evans)  – 4:44
"Saville Row" (Ham) :36
"Moonshine" (Evans, Jackson)  – 3:53
"Back Again" (Gibbins)  – 2:54
"Turn Around" (Jackson)  – 4:17
"Rockin' Machine" (Gibbins)  – 1:32

CD 2
"Time Is Mine" (Ham)  – 1:45
"Smokin' Gun" (Ham)  – 1:22
"Old Fashioned Notions" (Gibbins)  – 4:12
"Nothing to Show" (Ham)  – 1:03
"You Ask Yourself Why" (Gibbins)  – 2:17
"Keep Your Country Tidy" (Ham)  – 2:23
"To Say Goodbye" (Jackson)  – 3:46
"Queen of Darkness" (Evans)  – 2:13
"I Can't Believe In" (Ham)  – 2:10
"Thanks to You All" (Gibbins)  – 2:41
"Lay Me Down" (Ham)  – 2:55

Original track listing

The original track listing consisted of the 10 songs on disc one and was originally compiled by Kenny Kerner and Richie Wise.

Side one
"Lay Me Down"
"Turn Around"
"Keep Believing"
"Rockin' Machine"
"Passed Fast"

Side two
"Saville Row"
"Moonshine"
"Rock and Roll Contract"
"Back Again"
"Hey, Mr. Manager"

Personnel

Pete Ham: guitar, keyboards, vocals
Tom Evans: bass, synthesizer, vocals
Bob Jackson: guitar, keyboards, vocals
Mike Gibbins: drums, percussion, vocals

References

2000 albums
Badfinger albums
Albums recorded at Apple Studios
Albums published posthumously